Maniacal Laughter is The Bouncing Souls' second full-length album, which includes "The Ballad Of Johnny X," and  "Here We Go." The album also contains a cover of "Born to Lose," which was originally performed by Ted Daffan. "Lamar Vannoy" is included in the opening sequence of Larry Clark's 2002 film Ken Park.

Track listing 
All songs written by The Bouncing Souls except where noted.
 "Lamar Vannoy" – 3:04
 "No Rules" – 1:10
 "The Freaks, Nerds, and Romantics" – 2:32
 "Argyle" – 2:35
 "All of This and Nothing" – 0:55
 "The BMX Song" – 1:57
 "Quick Chek Girl" – 2:52
 "Headlights.... Ditch!" – 0:43
 "Here We Go" – 1:58
 "Born to Lose" (Frankie Brown, Daffan) – 2:07
 "Moon Over Asbury" – 1:45
 "The Ballad of Johnny X" (Johnny X, The Bouncing Souls) – 2:06

Personnel 
 Greg Attonito – vocals
 Pete Steinkopf – guitar
 Bryan Keinlen – bass, artwork
 Shal Khichi – drums
 Thom Wilson – engineer
 Andy VanDette – technician
 Johnny X – guitar and vocals on "The Ballad of Johnny X"

References 

The Bouncing Souls albums
1996 albums
Chunksaah Records albums
Albums produced by Thom Wilson
BYO Records albums